The Xiaomi Smart Band 7 is a wearable activity tracker produced by Xiaomi Inc. It was launched in China on 24 May 2022, and globally starting 21 June 2022. It has a 1.62-inch, 490 x 192 pixels resolution capacitive AMOLED display and 24/7 heart rate monitor and a SpO2 sensor. It also comes with a NFC variant.

References 

Sports equipment
Wearable computers
Activity trackers
Xiaomi
Products introduced in 2022
Smart bands